Michael John Foster may refer to:

 Michael Foster (Worcester MP) (born 1963), British Labour Party politician
 Michael John Foster (Scouting) (born 1952), British Scout leader and Anglican priest

See also
 Michael Foster (disambiguation)